Yubara Dam is a dam in Okayama Prefecture, Japan, completed in 1954.

At the base of the dam wall is a small village with a number of onsen hotels. There is also an outdoor, mixed bathing bath, or rotenburo, by the river. This facility is free.

References 

Dams in Okayama Prefecture
Dams completed in 1954